Brett Clouthier (born June 9, 1981) is a Canadian former professional ice hockey player who last played for the Allen Americans of the Central Hockey League.

Playing career

Born in Ottawa, Ontario, Clouthier began his career in 1998, playing at the junior level for the Kingston Frontenacs of the OHL.  He made an immediate impact, and in 64 games established himself as an 'enforcer', totalling 227 penalty minutes.  He also weighed in with his own fair share of points, grabbing a total of 22.  This promise was spotted by the NHL's New Jersey Devils, who drafted Clouthier number 50 in the 1999 entry draft, their second pick overall.

He did not make an appearance for the Devils, but continued to play for the Frontenacs for a further two seasons, again posting impressive numbers, with his points production steadily increasing to reach a peak of 58 points in 68 games in his final season, 2000/01.  This production led to him being progressed to the Devils' affiliate team, the Albany River Rats of the AHL.  Clouthier continued to pile up the penalty minutes and provide the team with a tough backbone but in two full seasons with the River Rats could only manage 17 points.

This led to him being dropped to the UHL for the 2003–04 season, where he iced for only two games for the Adirondack IceHawks before being re-called to the River Rats, who had missed his physical, intimidating style.  Clouthier would not finish the season at the River Rats though, with his third club being the Cincinnati Cyclones of the ECHL, a level lower than he had been playing at in Albany.

Again this would only prove to be a temporary measure though, and Clouthier would again ice for the River Rats to start the 2004/05 season, making another 46 appearances throughout the season, clocking 168 penalty minutes.  During this season he would spend another short spell at an ECHL club, this time the Augusta Lynx.  At the end of the season, Clouthier was finally released from the River Rats having spent a total of four seasons there.

He took the opportunity to sign for one of their AHL rivals, the Binghamton Senators in the summer of 2005.  Clouthier was a reliable player for the Senators, missing only one game all season for the affiliate team of the more well-known NHL Ottawa Senators.  In the summer of 2006 Clouthier was lured to Europe to sign for the Sheffield Steelers in Britain's EIHL.  Despite playing well for the Steelers and continuing his well-earned reputation as an enforcer, Clouthier was released half way through the season, and immediately joined the Manchester Phoenix, fierce rivals of the Steelers.

During his time at the Phoenix, Clouthier established himself as somewhat of a fan favourite through his rough, physical style.  He brought a tougher backbone to the team and managed to total almost a point a game during a 23-game spell, before the Phoenix's 2006/07 season was brought to a halt with a playoff loss.  Clouthier had proved himself to be an excellent addition to the Phoenix squad and so was re-signed in the summer by player/coach Tony Hand along with former Augusta Lynx team-mate Brian Passmore.  A further outstanding season would follow from Clouthier, culminating in his winning the 2007/08 'Hard As Ice' award at the 'Man of Ice' awards ceremony.

It was announced in May 2008 that Clouthier has again re-signed to play for the Phoenix in the 2008/09 season.  Clouthier would continue his form for the Phoenix throughout the season, again proving to be one of the league's top enforcers.  His physical play and 34 points in 68 games helped push the Phoenix to both the Challenge and Knock-Out Cup finals, the organisation's most successful season to date.  Clouthier would again win the 'Hard as Ice' awards at the 'Man of Ice' awards presentation.  Despite the on-ice success, financial problems would continue and in the summer of 2009 Phoenix owner Neil Morris announced that the Manchester team would ice the following season in the lower English Premier Ice Hockey League.  As the English Premier League has a much lower import limit, and the UK Border Agency will not allow work permits for Ice Hockey players playing outside the top league in the country, it would be impossible for Clouthier to have re-signed despite his popularity.  During his two and a half seasons in Manchester Clouthier was a firm fan-favourite, and when he left many fans called for his number 16 to be retired.

On hearing that his contract would not be renewed, Clouthier returned to his native North America to sign for the Rio Grande Valley Killer Bees of the Central Hockey League. In addition to this he also attended a Providence Bruins training camp and was awarded with a Professional Tryout contract, which he was released from after 8 games.

Career stats

External links

Brett Clouthier Personal Profile, Manchester Phoenix Official Website.
'2007/08 Man Of Ice Awards', Official Man Of Ice Website.
'Phoenix Welcome Back Own Hitman', Manchester Phoenix Official Website, 27/05/08.
'Killer Bees Sign Heavyweight Clouthier', Rio Grande Valley Killer Bees Official Website, 11/08/09

1981 births
Albany River Rats players
Augusta Lynx players
Binghamton Senators players
Canadian ice hockey left wingers
Cincinnati Cyclones (ECHL) players
Ice hockey people from Ottawa
Living people
Manchester Phoenix players
New Jersey Devils draft picks
Rio Grande Valley Killer Bees players
Sheffield Steelers players
Canadian expatriate ice hockey players in England